Hay Al-Jamiaa  is a neighborhood near the Mansour district of Baghdad, Iraq. 

Its small river name Aldawoody otherwise government removed small river and created an area for houses. 
The neighborhood was originally created during the mid-1960s, to provide housing and its old name Aldawoody was changed to Alkhaadraa. Now its name is Hay Al-Jamia and the government gave some of the houses for Ministry of Agriculture, some houses for a companion in Baath Party, some for police and some for university professors.

In old times (Hay Aljamiaa) three part the first part name alshurta means police houses, the second dor alrefaq means house of a companion in Baath Party and the third part jamiaa means university in Arabic. Hence, its full name is "Hay Al-Jamia" or "University Neighborhood".

During the recent sectarian troubles that plagued Baghdad, Hay Al-Jamia became one of the primary troubled areas in Western Baghdad, to the point that during the period from late 2006 to early 2007, the whole neighborhood became a de facto "ghost town". However, after the return of security in 2008, it has regained much of its former vitality.

Geography
It is bordered by the following neighborhoods: Al-Adil to the North, Al-Mansur and Al-Dawoodi to the East, Al-Shurta to the South, and Al-Khadraa and Al-Ghazaliah to the West.

Transport
Al-Rabiaa Street is a major access road and the main market area, and passes from north to south in the eastern half of Al-Jami'a.

References

Jami'a
1960s establishments in Iraq